The 1998 Washington State Cougars football team represented Washington State University in the 1998 NCAA Division I-A football season. Head coach Mike Price was in his tenth season, and the team played its home games on campus at Martin Stadium in Pullman, Washington.

Schedule

References

Washington State
Washington State Cougars football seasons
Washington State Cougars football